Communist Platform may refer to:

Communist Platform (Germany)
Communist Platform (Netherlands)
Communist Platform (Norway)